Shane Black (born December 16, 1961) is an American filmmaker and actor who has written such films as Lethal Weapon, The Monster Squad, The Last Boy Scout, Last Action Hero, and The Long Kiss Goodnight. He is also known as the original creator of the Lethal Weapon franchise. As an actor, Black is best known for his role as Rick Hawkins in Predator (1987).

He made his directorial debut with the film Kiss Kiss Bang Bang in 2005. Black went on to write and direct Iron Man 3 (2013), The Nice Guys (2016), and The Predator (2018).

Early life and education
Black was born and raised in Pittsburgh, Pennsylvania, the son of Paul and Patricia Ann Black. His father was in the printing business, and helped Black get an interest in hardboiled fiction, such as the works of Mickey Spillane and the Matt Helm series.

After living in the suburbs of Lower Burrell and Mount Lebanon, Pennsylvania, his family moved to Fullerton, California, during his sophomore year of high school. There he attended Sunny Hills High School and later UCLA where he majored in film and theater and graduated in 1983. Black had a long history writing comic strips, short stories, and journalism. During his senior year he decided to make a living from it once his classmate Fred Dekker showed him a science fiction script he did for an assignment. Black's older brother, Terry Black, also wrote short stories and decided to move into screenplays starting with 1988's Dead Heat, in which Shane has a cameo.

Career

Screenwriting and acting
After graduating, Black worked as a typist for a temp agency, a data entry clerk for the 1984 Summer Olympics and an usher in a Westwood movie theater. Eventually he asked for financial support of his parents during the six-month development of a script, The Shadow Company, a supernatural thriller set in Vietnam. With Dekker's help, the script landed him an agent and several meetings with mid-level studio executives. This attracted 20th Century Fox executives, who were interested in having Black rewrite scripts. Eventually Black wrote an action film script, Lethal Weapon, in about six weeks, which landed him a $250,000 deal with Warner Bros. During the rewrites, Black asked producer Joel Silver for a small acting role in another film Silver was preparing at the time, Predator, a film for which Black also made uncredited contributions to the script. At the same time, Black helped Dekker write The Monster Squad, which along with Lethal Weapon and Predator came out in 1987. Since then, Black has acted in five additional films and in two episodes for the TV series Dark Justice.

Once Warner Bros. requested a Lethal Weapon sequel, Black wrote the first draft  of Lethal Weapon 2 with the help of novelist Warren Murphy. Although it was not used, Black said in later interviews that Warner Bros. did not like his original script for Lethal Weapon 2, which was also titled Play Dirty, because of how dark and violent it was and due to his decision to kill off main character Martin Riggs in the ending of the script. Black considers it to be his best work and the best script he has written.

Feeling burned out and having conflicts with the studio, Black left the project after six months, earning $125,000 (out of a $250,000 payment split with Murphy) for his work. After two sabbatical years, Black decided to take on an old idea of his that emerged during the production of Lethal Weapon and turn it into a full screenplay. The result, The Last Boy Scout, earned him $1.75 million in 1991. Black would also earn $1 million for his rewrite of Last Action Hero in 1993. He would set a record by receiving $4 million for writing The Long Kiss Goodnight in 1994.

Directing 
Black made his directorial debut with 2005's Kiss Kiss Bang Bang, and later directed (and co-wrote with Drew Pearce) 2013's Iron Man 3, which ranks as the fifteenth-highest-grossing film of all time worldwide.

Black next directed and co-wrote Edge, a pilot for a potential series for Amazon Studios. The film was released on video on demand but not picked up for a series. He followed this with the action comedy The Nice Guys, starring Russell Crowe and Ryan Gosling, and produced by Joel Silver. Warner Bros. handled North American rights to the film, which was released on May 20, 2016.

Black next directed the fourth non-Alien-related film in the Predator series, The Predator, which he co-wrote with Fred Dekker. The film was released on September 14, 2018.

Black's next projects included an adaptation of Doc Savage, and The Destroyer, based on the series of paperback adventure novels that previously inspired the 1985 film Remo Williams: The Adventure Begins, starring Fred Ward. He was also briefly attached by Warner Bros. in 2011, to direct a live-action American adaptation of the Japanese supernatural-thriller manga series Death Note, bringing his collaborators Anthony Bagarozzi and Charles Mondry to write the screenplay, replacing Charley and Vlas Parlapanides as the project's previous screenwriters. However, by 2014, he had left the project, due to reported creative differences and other commitments. Director Adam Wingard was eventually hired to helm the project by 2015.

Style 
Black has a recognizable writing style characterized by stories in which two main characters become friends, problematic protagonists who become better human beings at the end of the narrative, and trade witty dialogue, featuring labyrinthine crime plots, often set during Christmas time. The quips he incorporates into his scripts are referred to as "Shane Blackisms", in which jokes about the story situations are included in the scene directions of the script. He also sometimes directs comments at studio executives and script readers. Examples of these include:

From Lethal Weapon:

From The Last Boy Scout:

This approach, which Black summed as "more open to the reader" and aimed at "trying to keep people awake", was described by himself as a combination of William Goldman, his mentor in screenwriting, and Walter Hill, who had a "terse and Spartan, punchy prose". Black gave a list of techniques he uses when writing films in an interview with The Guardian.

Black explains that Christmas, which has been used as a backdrop in Lethal Weapon, Last Action Hero, The Long Kiss Goodnight, Kiss Kiss Bang Bang, Iron Man 3 and The Nice Guys (and in his original script for The Last Boy Scout, although references to the date have been almost entirely eliminated from the film), is a touchstone for him, explaining:

Christmas represents a little stutter in the march of days, a hush in which we have a chance to assess and retrospect our lives. I tend to think also that it just informs as a backdrop. The first time I noticed it was Three Days of the Condor, the Sydney Pollack film, where Christmas in the background adds this really odd, chilling counterpoint to the espionage plot. I also think that Christmas is just a thing of beauty, especially as it applies to places like Los Angeles, where it's not so obvious, and you have to dig for it, like little nuggets. One night, on Christmas Eve, I walked past a Mexican lunch wagon serving tacos, and I saw this little string, and on it was a little broken plastic figurine, with a light bulb inside it, of the Virgin Mary. And I thought, that's just a little hidden piece of magic. You know, all around the city are little slices, little icons of Christmas, that are as effective and beautiful in and of themselves as any 40-foot Christmas tree on the lawn of the White House. So that, in a lot of words, is the answer.

The Predator casting controversy 
Black hired his friend Steven Wilder Striegel for a minor, un-auditioned role in The Predator (as well as, previously, Iron Man 3 and The Nice Guys). Striegel spent six months in prison in 2010, having pleaded guilty to risk of injury to a child and enticing a minor by computer after he had attempted to lure a 14-year-old girl into a sexual relationship via email. Olivia Munn, an actress in The Predator, insisted on having a scene with Striegel removed after she discovered his history. Black initially defended his decision and his friend, but later rescinded them and released a public apology.

Awards and honors
Black received the Distinguished Screenwriter Award from the Austin Film Festival October 21, 2006. In 2005, he received the Best Original Screenplay award for Kiss Kiss Bang Bang from the San Diego Film Critics Association.

Filmography

Film

Uncredited script doctor
 Predator (1987)
 Dead Heat (1988)
 The Hunt for Red October (1990)
 RoboCop 3 (1993)

Unproduced
 Shadow Company (1988)

Television

Acting credits

References

External links

 
 

1961 births
Living people
Male actors from Pittsburgh
American male film actors
American male screenwriters
UCLA Film School alumni
20th-century American male actors
21st-century American male actors
Science fiction film directors
Film directors from Pennsylvania
Writers from Pittsburgh
Film producers from Pennsylvania
Male actors from Orange County, California
People from Fullerton, California
Film directors from California
Film producers from California
Screenwriters from California
Screenwriters from Pennsylvania